Ertuğrul Gazi Mosque or Ärtogrul Gazy Mosque is a mosque in Ashgabat, Turkmenistan. It is a prominent landmark in Ashgabat with its four minarets and a central dome and has a lavish interior decoration with fine stained glass windows.

History 
The mosque was inaugurated in 1998 after the independence of Turkmenistan in 1990. It is named after Ertuğrul, the father of Osman I, founder of the Ottoman Empire, and was built by Hilmi Şenalp. 

Several accidental deaths took place during the construction, and this has led to a belief that the mosque is cursed.

Description 
The white marbled building is reminiscent of the Blue Mosque of Istanbul. The mosque accommodates up to 5,000 worshipers at a time.

References

External links

Ashgabat Ertuğrul Gazi Mosque and Cultural Center, picture gallery  at Hassa Architecture

1998 establishments in Turkmenistan
Buildings and structures in Ashgabat
Mosques completed in 1998
Mosques in Turkmenistan